Kováčová  is a village and municipality in the Rožňava District in the Košice Region of middle-eastern Slovakia.

History
In historical records the village was first mentioned in 1254.

Geography
The village lies at an altitude of 454 metres and covers an area of 13.818 km².
It has a population of about 97 people.

Culture
The village has a public library.

Genealogical resources

The records for genealogical research are available at the state archive "Statny Archiv in Kosice, Slovakia"

 Roman Catholic church records (births/marriages/deaths): 1732-1895 (parish B)

See also
 List of municipalities and towns in Slovakia

External links
 
 Kováčová
https://web.archive.org/web/20071027094149/http://www.statistics.sk/mosmis/eng/run.html
Surnames of living people in Kovacova

Villages and municipalities in Rožňava District